The Deutsches Filminstitut – DIF ("German Film Institute") is an institute for the study of film, based in Frankfurt am Main, Germany.

History
The Deutsches Filminstitut was founded on 13 April 1949 as the Deutsches Institut für Filmkunde (DIF). In 1952, the Deutsches Filmarchiv ("German Film Archive"; founded in Marburg in 1947 by Hanns Wilhelm Lavies as the Archiv für Filmwissenschaft) was set up as an autonomous department of the DIF, from which it separated again after a reorganisation in 1956.

On 1 January 1959, Lavies left the DIF and was succeeded as director by Max Lippmann. Theo Fürstenau became director in 1966, and in 1981 Gerd Albrecht. The director from 1 February 1997 until September 2017 was Claudia Dillmann.

On 30 October 1999, the name was officially changed to Deutsches Filminstitut – DIF.

Functions
The Deutsches Filminstitut has one of the largest film archives in Germany and one of the most comprehensive collections of material on all aspects of cinematography and cinema.

Current projects include:
 The edition and publication of the censorship decisions of the Berliner Film-Oberprüfstelle ("Berlin Film Inspection Point") from 1920 to 1938
 COLLATE – a collaborative system for the annotation and indexing of archive material
 filmportal.de – an internet portal for German film
 filmarchives-online.eu – union catalogue of European film archives
 EFG – The European Film Gateway – a single access point to digital collections held in European film archives and cinémathèques

The DIF is a founding member of the Deutscher Kinemathekenverbund ("German Union of Cinematheques").

See also 
 Museumsufer

References

External links
 
 
 COLLATE – Collaborative System for Annotation, Indexing and Retrieval of Digitized Historical Archive Material
filmportal.de
 filmarchives-online.eu – union catalogue of European film archives
 europeanfilmgateway.eu- a single access point to digital collections held in European film archives and cinémathèques
 Films about WW1 on The European Film Gateway
 Deutsches Filmmuseum, Frankfurt am Main

Film organisations in Germany
Museums in Frankfurt
Cinema museums in Germany
1949 establishments in Germany
Arts organizations established in 1949
Film archives in Germany
FIAF-affiliated institutions